Favonius taxila is a butterfly in the family Lycaenidae. It is found in the Russian Far East, north-eastern China, Korea and Japan.

Subspecies
 Favonius taxila taxila (Amur, Ussuri, Japan: Hokkaido)
 Favonius taxila xinlongensis Murayama, 1991 (Central China)

References

Butterflies described in 1861
Theclini
Butterflies of Asia
Taxa named by Otto Vasilievich Bremer